Epigenes may refer to:

 Epigenes of Athens, an Ancient Greek comic poet
 Epigenes of Byzantium, an Ancient Greek astrologer
 Epigenes of Sicyon, an Ancient Greek tragedist
 Epigenes, son of Antiphon, a disciple of Socrates
 Epigenes (crater), a lunar crater named after the astrologer

See also
 Epigenesis (disambiguation)